Reneau is a surname. Notable people with the surname include:

 Brenda Reneau (1954–2013), American politician
 Dan Reneau (born 1940), the current president of Louisiana Tech University
 Enrique Reneau (1971–2015), Honduran football player
 Francis Reneau (or Frankie Reneau), pianist and composer from Belize
 Marion Reneau (born 1977), American professional mixed martial artist
 Paul Réneau (born 1960), Belizean former athlete
 Reneau Z. Peurifoy (born 1949), non-fiction author
 Stanley Reneau, Belizean professional football goalkeeper
 Wernell Reneau (born 1965), Belizean former cyclist

See also
 Aroneanu
 Rammenau
 Rennau
 Rheinau (disambiguation)

French-language surnames